A list of Dutch bands and artists of contemporary music. The bands and artists are either Dutch, of Dutch origin or contain Dutch members.

A 

Thomas Acda (b. 1967): Dutch actor and singer
Sharon den Adel (b. 1974): Dutch singer and composer
Afrojack
Rob Agerbeek (b. 1937): Indonesian-born Dutch boogie-woogie and jazz pianist 
Jan Akkerman (b. 1946): Dutch guitarist
Alain Clark
Willeke Alberti (b. 1945): Dutch singer and actress
Willy Alberti (1926–1985): Dutch singer, actor, and radio and TV personality
Ali B
Alice Deejay
Amber
Louis Andriessen
Angel-Eye
Anneke van Giersbergen
Anouk (b. 1975): Dutch singer
Armin van Buuren
André Rieu

Back to top

B 

Ali B (b. 1981): Dutch rapper and comedian of Moroccan descent.
Baas B
George Baker
Cor Bakker
Jim Bakkum (b. 1987): Dutch singer and actor
Lou Bandy (1890–1959): Dutch singer and conferencier
Olav Basoski
Bassjackers
Blasterjaxx
Frans Bauer (b. 1973): Dutch singer of "het levenslied"
Han Bennink
Thomas Berge
Marco Blaauw
Blaudzun
Karin Bloemen
Scott Bloemendaal (1912–1964): Dutch Composer, music critic and essayist
Frank Boeijen (b. 1957): Dutch singer
Ferdi Bolland
Rob Bolland
Bonky (Onno Borgen)
Boris (b. 1980): Dutch singer, winner of Idols
Marco Borsato (b. 1966): Dutch singer
Stef Bos (b. 1961): Dutch singer, also sings in Afrikaans
Patty Brard (b. 1955):  Indo (Dutch-Indonesian) entertainer as a TV personality and singer
Arjan Breukhoven (b. 1962): organist and choir conductor
Ria Brieffies
Willem Breuker
Corry Brokken (1932–2016): Dutch singer
Herman Brood (1946–2001): Dutch musician, painter and media personality
Brutus
Xander de Buisonjé
Marga Bult
Armin van Buuren (b. 1976): Dutch trance music producer and DJ

Back to top

C 

Humphrey Campbell
Rudi Carrell (1934–2006): Dutch television entertainer and host of The Rudi Carrell Show
The Cats
Eddy Christiani
Alain Clark
Robbert van de Corput (otherwise known as Hardwell) DJ and producer
Ferry Corsten (b. 1973): Dutch trance music producer, DJ, and remixer
Jules de Corte (1924–1996): Blind singer-songwriter from the Netherlands
Gerard Cox
Ben Cramer

Back to top

D 

Ellen ten Damme (b. 1967): Dutch actress and singer
Louis Davids
Def Rhymz (b. 1970): Dutch rapper
Esmée Denters
Bill van Dijk (b. 1947): Dutch singer and musical performer
Louis van Dijk (1941–2020): Dutch pianist
Sander Van Doorn (b. 1979): Dutch electro house DJ and record producer
Hans Dorrestijn (b. 1940): Dutch comedian
Wieteke van Dort (b. 1943): Dutch actress, comedian, singer, writer and artist
Tim Douwsma
Dorus
André van Duin (b. 1947): Dutch actor (in comedy and theatre), singer, writer and program creator
Candy Dulfer (b. 1969): Dutch smooth jazz alto saxophonist
Hans Dulfer (b. 1940): Dutch jazz musician who plays tenor saxophone
Willem Duyn
Duncan Laurence (b. 1994): Dutch singer-songwriter, winner of the Eurovision Song Contest 2019

Back to top

E 

Polle Eduard
Eva Simons
EliZe (b. 1982): Dutch singer-songwriter

Back to top

F 

Bobby Farrell (1949–2010): Dutch performer in the 1970s pop and disco group Boney M.
Fedde Le Grand
Firebeatz
René Froger (b. 1960): Dutch singer
Leo Fuld (1912–1997): Dutch singer who specialised in Yiddish songs
Laura Fygi (b. 1955): Dutch singer

Back to top

G 

Tess Gaerthé (b. 1991):  Dutch singer
Martijn Garritsen (AKA Martin Garrix), DJ known for his hit single "Animals"
Eelco Gelling
Glennis Grace (b. 1978):  Dutch singer
Anneke Grönloh
Boudewijn de Groot (b. 1944):  Dutch singer-songwriter
Angela Groothuizen

Back to top

H 

Bernard Haitink
Tol Hansse
Wardt van der Harst a member of the EDM duo W&W
Esther Hart (b. 1970):  Dutch singer
Barry Hay (b. 1948): Dutch vocalist with the group Golden Earring
André Hazes (1951–2004):  Dutch singer of "het levenslied
Heintje
Misja Helsloot
Toon Hermans (1916–2000): Dutch comedian, singer and writer
Mathijs Heyligers (b. 1957): violinist and violin maker
Antonie Kamerling (1966–2010): Dutch television and film actor
Hind (b. 1984): Dutch singer
José Hoebee (b. 1954): Dutch pop female singer
Rob Hoeke
Barry Hughes
Henny Huisman (b. 1951): Dutch television presenter
Ilse Huizinga (b. 1966): Dutch jazz singer

Back to top

I 

Imran Khan

Back to top

J 

Pim Jacobs (1934–1996):  Dutch jazz pianist and television presenter
Ruth Jacott
Marike Jager (b. 1979):  Dutch singer, guitarist and composer
Floor Jansen
Ernst Jansz
Candee Jay
DJ Jean (b. 1968):  Dutch disc jockey
Gerard Joling (b. 1960): Dutch singer and television presenter
Freek de Jonge (b. 1944): Dutch cabaret performer
Johnny Jordaan (1924–1989): Dutch folk singer
Tjibbe Joustra (b. 1951): Dutch artist of paintings, videoart, graphic design, soundscapes
Julian Jordan

Back to top

K 

Jerney Kaagman
Pierre Kartner (b. 1935): Dutch musician also known as Father Abraham
Greetje Kauffeld (b. 1939): Dutch jazz singer and Schlager musician
Simon Keizer Nick & Simon
Kensington
Sharon Kips (b. 1983): Dutch singer
René Klijn
Tim Kliphuis (b. 1974): Dutch violinist
Peter Koelewijn (b. 1940): Dutch producer and songwriter, founding father of Dutch language rock and roll
Jean Koning
Lenny Kuhr (b. 1950): Dutch singer-songwriter
Wolter Kroes

Back to top

L 

Natalie La Rose: singer, model
Wilma Landkroon (b. 1957): Dutch pop singer
Yuri Landman (b. 1973): Dutch experimental luthier and musicologist
Ilse De Lange
Lange Frans
Thé Lau
 Duncan Laurence (b. 1994): Dutch singer-songwriter
Thijs van Leer (b. 1948): Dutch keyboardist, singer, composer, member of Focus
Paul de Leeuw (b. 1962):  Dutch television comedian, singer and actor
Robbie van Leeuwen
Legowelt ( – ): Dutch electro musician
Heddy Lester (b. 1950): Dutch singer and actress
Liesbeth List (1941–2020): Dutch singer and chansonnier
Jamai Loman (b. 1986): Dutch singer, reality show winner
Robert Long (1943–2006): Dutch singer and television presenter
Huub van der Lubbe
Suzanna Lubrano (b. 1975): Cape Verdean Zouk singer based in Rotterdam
Arjen Anthony Lucassen (b. 1960): Dutch composer and musician
Erik van der Luijt (b. 1970): Dutch jazz pianist / keyboard player, arranger, composer, producer and band leader

Back to top

M 

Maan (b. 1997): Dutch singer and actress
Maggie MacNeal (b. 1950)
Tom Manders
André Manuel (b. 1966): Dutch singer and performer
Maribelle
Marlayne (b. 1971): Dutch singer and television presenter
Martin Garrix
Maud (b. 1981): Dutch singer, reality show finalist
Guus Meeuwis (b. 1972): Dutch singer and songwriter
Meau (b. 2000): Dutch singer-songwriter
Miners of Muzo
Misha Mengelberg
Willem Mengelberg
Michelle (b. 1981): Dutch singer
CB Milton (b. 1968): Dutch Euro-house vocalist
Michael Moore
Irene Moors
Danny de Munk (b. 1970): Dutch actor, singer, musical actor and former child star
Harry Muskee

Back to top

N 

Nielson (b. 1989): Dutch singer-songwriter
Noisia (b. 2002): Dutch Drum and Bass and Breaks
Normaal (b. 1974): Dutch rockband

Back to top

O 

Jacob Obrecht
Trijntje Oosterhuis (b. 1973): Dutch pop and jazz singer
Wijnand Ott
Oliver Heldens

Back to top

P 

Patricia Paay (b. 1949): Dutch model, singer, and commercial actress
Poldervokaal — Dutch vocal ensemble, formed in 1986

Back to top

R 

Sandra Reemer
Carlo Resoort
Rita Reys (1924–2013): Dutch jazz singer
André Rieu (b. 1949 ): Dutch violinist, conductor, and composer
Edsilia Rombley (b. 1978): Dutch singer
Maarten van Roozendaal
Stochelo Rosenberg
Jan Rot
Nicky Romero
R3hab

Back to top

S 

 S10 (b. 2000): Dutch singer, rapper and songwriter
Harry Sacksioni (b. 1950):  Dutch composer and guitar virtuoso
Daniël Sahuleka
Mathilde Santing
Peter Schaap
Marga Scheide (b. 1954):  Dutch former model and singer
Nick Schilder Nick & Simon
Teddy Scholten (1926–2010): Dutch singer
Birgit Schuurman (b. 1977): Dutch rock singer and actress
Katja Schuurman (b. 1975): Dutch television and film actress, VJ, singer, and television personality
Milly Scott (b. 1933): Dutch singer and actress
Ramses Shaffy (1933–2009): Dutch singer, chansonnier, and actor
René Shuman (b. 1967): Dutch singer
Eva Simons
Sita
Jan Smit
Monique Smit
Wibi Soerjadi (b. 1970): Dutch internationally recognized concert pianist
Solex
Wim Sonneveld (1917–1974): Dutch cabaret artist and singer
Spinvis (Erik de Jong) (b. 1961): Dutch pop singer and musician
San Holo
Bonnie St. Claire
Ede Staal
De Staat
Thérèse Steinmetz
Robert Jan Stips
Suzanna Lubrano
Jan Pieterszoon Sweelinck

Back to top

T 

Mieke Telkamp
Julian Thomas
Tiësto (b. 1969): trance DJ and electronic dance music producer
Mirjam Timmer (b. 1982): Dutch singer-songwriter
Ronnie Tober (b. 1945): Dutch-born singer
Lee Towers (b. 1946): Dutch singer

Back to top

V 

Valensia (b. 1971): Dutch singer, composer, producer and multi-instrumentalist
Ria Valk
Conny Vandenbos (1937–2002): Dutch singer
Vast Countenance
Herman van Veen (b. 1945): Dutch stage performer, actor, musician and singer/songwriter and author
Cees Veerman
Piet Veerman
Vengaboys
Venus Flytrap: Dutch indie rock band
Danny Vera (b. 1977): Dutch singer-songwriter and musician 
Mariska Veres (1947–2006): Dutch lead singer of the rock group Shocking Blue
Vicetone
Ad Visser
Eefje de Visser
Hans Vonk
Cornelis Vreeswijk (1937–1987): Dutch singer-songwriter, poet, and actor
Henny Vrienten (b. 1948): Dutch composer of TV- and film-scores
Erwin de Vries

Back to top

W 

Toni Willé (b. 1953): Dutch singer, songwriter
Edo de Waart
Linda Wagenmakers (b. 1975): Dutch singer
Nick van de Wall (AKA Afrojack) DJ and music producer
Albert West
Henk Westbroek (b. 1952): Dutch radio host, singer, songwriter and café owner
Danny Wolfers
Piter Wilkens (b. 1959): Dutch singer, guitarist, composer, lyricist, and producer
Henk Wijngaard (b. 1946): Dutch country singer

Back to top

Y 

Yes-R

Back to top

Z 

Zangeres zonder Naam

Back to top

See also
 List of bands from the Netherlands
 List of Afrikaans singers
 List of Dutch hip hop musicians
 List of Dutch singers
 List of Dutch composers

 
 
Lists of musicians by nationality
Musicians
Musicians